Bryorella is a genus of fungi in the class Dothideomycetes. The relationship of this taxon to other taxa within the class is unknown (incertae sedis).

Species
Bryorella acrogena
Bryorella complanata
Bryorella compressa
Bryorella conspecta
Bryorella crassitecta
Bryorella cryptocarpa
Bryorella erumpens
Bryorella gregaria
Bryorella imitans
Bryorella marginis
Bryorella punctiformis
Bryorella retiformis
Bryorella semi-immersa

See also 
 List of Dothideomycetes genera incertae sedis

References

External links 
 Bryorella at Index Fungorum

Dothideomycetes enigmatic taxa
Dothideomycetes genera